Sharon Duncan-Brewster (born 8 February 1976) is a British actress. She is known for her role as Crystal Gordon in Bad Girls during the first four series; her role as Trina Johnson on EastEnders; and her role as Maggie Cain in the autumn 2009 Doctor Who special, The Waters of Mars. More recently, she has played Senator Tynnra Pamlo across the Star Wars franchise; Imperial Planetologist Dr. Liet-Kynes in Denis Villeneuve's adaptation of Frank Herbert's Dune; a genderbent version of Professor Moriarty in Enola Holmes 2.

Career
Duncan-Brewster portrayed the role of Crystal Gordon in the first four series of ITV prison drama series Bad Girls. After leaving the programme at the end of its fourth series she guest-starred in Holby City, Waking the Dead, Babyfather and daytime soap opera Doctors. From February to September 2009 Duncan-Brewster appeared on the BBC soap opera EastEnders as Trina Johnson, estranged wife of Lucas Johnson. She appeared in the 2009 Doctor Who special "The Waters of Mars" as Maggie Cain. Duncan-Brewster also appeared on the medical TV series Body Story in 1998, playing a club singer and influenza patient named Holly Jones. In 2011, Duncan-Brewster appeared in all four episodes of TV drama Top Boy. She originated the role of "C" in the play Crave by Sarah Kane, and played the role of Catherine Hunter, who is Alex Hunter's mother, in the FIFA 17's story mode known as "The Journey". Duncan-Brewster reprised the role of Catherine Hunter in FIFA 18's The Journey: Hunter Returns and FIFA 19's The Journey: Champions. She also portrayed Kitty in the BBC One production of The Long Song in December 2018.

In 2022, Duncan-Brewster worked in Enola Holmes 2 portraying a genderbent version of Professor Moriarty.

In the Star Wars universe, she portrays Senator Tynnra Pamlo. She first played the character in Rogue One: A Star Wars Story and later returned to voice the character in Star Wars: The Bad Batch.

Filmography

Film

Television

Video games

References

External links

Living people
Actresses from London
21st-century English actresses
English film actresses
English television actresses
Black British actresses
20th-century English actresses
English people of Jamaican descent
1976 births